Goncourt is a former commune in the Haute-Marne department in north-eastern France. On 1 January 2019, it was merged into the commune Bourmont-entre-Meuse-et-Mouzon.

See also
Communes of the Haute-Marne department

References

Former communes of Haute-Marne